Germany won the Eurovision Song Contest 2010, which was held in May 2010 in Oslo, Norway. The country's entry was selected in a series of competitive heats and a national final – Unser Star für Oslo – which was organised jointly by the public broadcasters ARD and NDR and the private television channel ProSieben, together with the three-time Eurovision participant for Germany (as singer and/or songwriter) and music producer, Stefan Raab.

Before Eurovision

Preparations 
On 25 May 2009, ARD and NDR was revealed to have approached Stefan Raab and private broadcaster ProSieben to collaborate in preparing for the 2010 Eurovision Song Contest with a view of creating a possible winning combination of artist and song. It was revealed that Raab had refused the request, but that ProSieben had accepted the offer. More information was revealed on 20 July 2009, with the news that Raab would in fact work with the two broadcasters in preparing for the 2010 contest.

Unser Star für Oslo 
Unser Star für Oslo 2010 (English: Our Star for Oslo) was the competition that selected Germany's entry for the Eurovision Song Contest 2010. The competition consisted of eight shows between 2 February and 12 March 2010 all taking place at the Köln-Mülheim Studios in Cologne, hosted by Matthias Opdenhövel and Sabine Heinrich. The national final was co-produced by Stefan Raab's production company Brainpool. Twenty contestants competed during the shows with the winner being selected through a public televote. The first five shows were broadcast on ProSieben, the quarter-final was broadcast on Das Erste as well as online via NDR's official website ndr.de, the semi-final was broadcast on ProSieben and the final was broadcast on Das Erste and online via ndr.de. The final of the competition was watched by 4.5 million viewers in Germany.

Format 
Interested artists were able to apply for the competition by submitting an online application. After submitting an application, artists could present themselves and perform at casting shows that were held in Cologne between 18 September 2009 and 6 November 2009. By the end of the process, it was announced that over 4,500 candidates had applied for the competition. The twenty contestants, most being inexperienced and young singers, were selected by an expert panel consisting of Raab and representatives of ARD.

The competition consisted of eight shows. In each of the first two shows on 2 and 9 February 2010, ten contestants performed a cover of a song of their choice and five advanced in the competition. In the third and fourth show on 16 and 23 February 2010, the remaining contestants performed and two were eliminated per show. In the fifth show on 2 March 2010, one contestant was eliminated, and the top five proceeded to the quarter-final on 5 March 2010. In the quarter-final, the five remaining contestants performed covers of two songs of their choice, and four advanced to the semi-final on 9 March 2010. In the semi-final, the four remaining contestants performed covers of two songs of their choice, and the top two proceeded to the final on 12 March 2010. The final consisted of two rounds. In the first round, the two finalists performed three songs especially written for Eurovision, and one song for each finalist proceeded to the second round. In the second round, the winner was decided from the two combinations of song and artist. During each show, Stefan Raab and two guest judges of varying members provided feedback in regards to the contestants. Public voting included options for landline and SMS voting. Each show featured a different pair of guest judges:
 Heat 1: Yvonne Catterfeld and Marius Müller-Westernhagen
 Heat 2: Sarah Connor and Peter Maffay
 Heat 3: Nena and König Boris
 Heat 4: Sasha and Cassandra Steen
 Heat 5: Joy Denalane and Rea Garvey
 Quarter-final: Anke Engelke and Adel Tawil
 Semi-final: Barbara Schöneberger and Jan Delay
 Final: Stefanie Kloß and Xavier Naidoo

Elimination chart

Shows

Final 
The televised final took place on 12 March 2010. The winner was selected through two rounds of public voting. In the first round, the two finalists Jennifer Braun and Lena Meyer-Landrut each performed their versions of "Bee" and "Satellite" as well as an individual song, and the song for each finalist was determined and proceeded to the second round. The songs were: "Satellite" performed by Lena Meyer-Landrut and "I Care for You" performed by Jennifer Braun. In the second round, the winner, "Satellite" performed by Lena Meyer-Landrut, was selected.

Promotion 
The six versions of the four finalist songs were released minutes after the final concluded. By 13 March Meyer-Landrut led the German iTunes download charts with all three of her songs: "Satellite" taking the top spot, followed by "Bee" in second and "Love Me" in third place. Jennifer Braun's song "I Care for You" took fourth place in the chart, followed by her versions of "Bee" and "Satellite" in 7th and 14th position respectively. A maxi single featuring Meyer-Landrut's three songs was released on 16 March. "Satellite" entered the German singles chart at number one and has been certified platinum since. On 16 March 2010, the video premiered on public broadcaster Das Erste right before Germany's most watched evening news bulletin Tagesschau. Shortly after, it was simultaneously shown on four private stations (Sat.1, ProSieben, kabel eins, N24) before the start of their evening prime time programmes. As of July 2021, the two officially uploaded YouTube videos of the song have jointly generated more than 109 million views since their release.

At Eurovision 

As a member of the "Big Four", Germany automatically qualified for the final on 29 May. Lena Meyer-Landrut performed 22nd out of the 25 participating countries and won the contest with 246 points. It is the first time that Germany has won the contest since 1982 and the first time as a unified state. As such, Germany hosted the Eurovision Song Contest 2011.

Voting

Points awarded to Germany

Points awarded by Germany

References

External links
 Unser Star für Oslo official website

2010
Countries in the Eurovision Song Contest 2010
Eurovision
Eurovision